Eugnosta fraudulenta is a species of moth of the family Tortricidae. It is found in Honduras and on the British Virgin Islands and Cuba.

The wingspan is 9–14 mm. The ground colour of the forewings is whitish with brownish grey suffusions and brown dots. The hindwings are whitish, tinged with grey-brown.

Etymology
The species name refers to characters of the genitalia and is derived from Latin fraudulenta (meaning delusive).

References

Moths described in 2007
Eugnosta